La Malinconia or Malinconia (melancholy) may refer to:

La Malinconia, the fourth movement of String Quartet No. 6 (Beethoven) 
 Malinconia, the second movement of Violin Sonata No. 2 (Ysaÿe)
La malinconia (string quartet), String Quartet No. 10, 1998, by Elena Firsova
"Malinconia" (song), song and 1981 single by Riccardo Fogli
Malinconia (Sibelius), Op. 20, a duet for cello & piano, a 1900 composition by Jean Sibelius
Malinconia (album), 2007, by Gunilla Süssmann and Tanja Tetzlaff
 Malinconia 2, a 1979 composition by Theodor Berger

See also
Melancholia (disambiguation)
Melancholy (disambiguation)
"Malinconia, Ninfa gentile", song by Vincenzo Bellini
"Malinconia d'amore", song by Giovanni D'Anzi
Il castello della malinconia, a 1920 film by Augusto Genina